The 2009 UEFA Women's Cup Final was played on 16 May and 22 May 2009 between Duisburg of Germany and Zvezda Perm of Russia. Duisburg won 7–1 on aggregate.

The 2nd-leg attendance of 28,112 was claimed by UEFA as a European record for women's club football, ignoring the existence of earlier  reported women's club match attendances of 53,000.

Match details

First leg

Second leg

References

Women's Cup Final
Uefa Women's Cup Final 2009
Uefa Women's Cup Final 2009
2009
UEFA
UEFA
UEFA